The 2011 Dominion of Canada Northern Ontario Provincial Men's Curling Championship was held February 6–13 at the Fort William Curling Club in Thunder Bay, Ontario.  The winning team of Brad Jacobs represented Northern Ontario at the 2011 Tim Hortons Brier in London, Ontario.

Teams

Standings

Results

Draw 1
February 6, 2:30 PM

Draw 2
February 6, 7:30 PM

Draw 3
February 7, 9:30 AM

Draw 4
February 7, 2:30 PM

Draw 5
February 7, 7:30 PM

Draw 6
February 8, 9:00 AM

Draw 7
February 8, 2:30 PM

Draw 8
February 8, 7:30 PM

Draw 9
February 9, 9:30 AM

Draw 10
February 9, 2:30 PM

Draw 11
February 9, 7:30 PM

Draw 12
February 10, 9:30 AM

Draw 13
February 10, 2:30 PM

Draw 14
February 10, 7:30 PM

Draw 15
February 11, 9:30 AM

Draw 16
February 11, 2:30 PM

Draw 17
February 7, 7:30 PM

TieBreaker
February 12, 9:30 AM

Playoffs

1 vs. 2
February 12, 2:30 PM

3 vs. 4
February 12, 7:30 PM

Semi-final
February 13, 9:00 AM

Final
February 13, 1:30 PM

References

2011 Tim Hortons Brier
Sports competitions in Thunder Bay
Curling in Northern Ontario
February 2011 sports events in Canada
2011 in Ontario